Turkish coup d'état may refer to:

Coup d'état
 Ottoman coups of 1807–1808
 1876 Ottoman coup d'état
 1912 Ottoman coup d'état
 1913 Ottoman coup d'état
 1960 Turkish coup d'état
 1962 Turkish coup d'état attempt
 
 
 
 1980 Turkish coup d'état
2016 Turkish coup d'état attempt
Memorandums
 1971 Turkish military memorandum
 
 1997 Turkish military memorandum
 E-memorandum
Cases associated with coup
 
 1993 alleged Turkish military coup
 Sarıkız, Ayışığı, Yakamoz and Eldiven
 Ergenekon trials
 Sledgehammer (alleged coup plan)
 Operation Cage Action Plan

 
Turkey